The 2019 Gasparilla Bowl was a college football bowl game played on December 23, 2019, with kickoff at 2:30 p.m. EST on ESPN. It was the 12th edition of the Gasparilla Bowl, although only the third under that name, and one of the 2019–20 bowl games concluding the 2019 FBS football season. Sponsored by lawn mower manufacturing company Bad Boy Mowers, the game was officially known as the Bad Boy Mowers Gasparilla Bowl.

Teams
The game matched the UCF Knights of the American Athletic Conference (The American) and the Marshall Thundering Herd of Conference USA (C–USA).  It was the fourth appearance in the Gasparilla Bowl for both teams (although their first Gasparilla Bowl against each other), leading all teams in Gasparilla Bowl appearances.

It was the twelfth overall meeting between UCF and Marshall; entering the game, UCF led the all-time series, 8–3.  From 2002 to 2012, UCF and Marshall were in the same conference; they both played in the Mid-American Conference from 2002 to 2004, then both joined C–USA in 2005 and played in that conference until UCF left to join The American in 2013.

UCF Knights

UCF entered the bowl with a 9–3 record (6–2 in conference), having finished in second place in the East Division of The American.

Marshall Thundering Herd

Marshall entered the game with an 8–4 record (6–2 in conference); they finished tied for second in the East Division of C–USA. The Thundering Herd were the defending Gasparilla Bowl champions, their 2018 team having won that season's Gasparilla Bowl over South Florida, 38–20.

Game summary

Statistics

Notes

References

External links

Game statistics at statbroadcast.com

Gasparilla Bowl
Gasparilla Bowl
Gasparilla Bowl
Gasparilla Bowl
Marshall Thundering Herd football bowl games
UCF Knights football bowl games